Walter Herman Andrews (17 April 1865 – 26 November 1908) was an English first-class cricketer who played for Sussex County Cricket Club.  His highest score of 67 came when playing for Sussex against Gloucestershire County Cricket Club.

He also played three non first-class games for Sussex against Hampshire.

References

External links

English cricketers
Eastbourne Town F.C. managers
Sussex cricketers
1865 births
1908 deaths